Senator Sears may refer to:

Harry L. Sears (1920–2002), New Jersey State Senate
Mason Sears (1899–1973), Massachusetts State Senate
Richard W. Sears (born 1943), Vermont State Senate
William R. Sears (New York politician) (1928–1998), New York State Senate